Josef Erber was a natural history dealer in Vienna. He made expeditions to the Greek Islands.

Selected works
1856 Beobachtungen über Zamenis aesculapii Wgl. Verh.zool.-bot.Ges.Wien 6 :393- 396 
1857 Weitere Beobachtungen über Zamenis Aesculapii Verh.zool.-bot.Ges.Wien 7:47- 48 	
1863 Beobachtungen an Amphibien in der Gefangenschaft Verh.zool.-bot.Ges.Wien 13:129- 132 
1864 Beiträge zur Lebensweise der Tarantel Verh.zool.-bot.Ges.Wien 14:717- 720 
1864 Die Amphibien der österr. Monarchie Verh.zool.-bot.Ges.Wien 14 : 
1865) Ueber die auf der Seestrandskiefer: Pinus halepensis Mich. lebenden schädlichen Insekten. (Seitenzahl Angabe korrekt, im Buch falsch papiniert) Verh.zool.-bot.Ges.Wien 15 : 943- 946 	
1867 Bemerkungen zu meiner Reise nach den griechischen Inseln. Verh. Zool.-Bot. Ges. Wien; 17: 853-856.
1868. Bericht über eine Reise nach Rhodus. Verhandl. Zool. (Bot.) Ges. Wien. 18:903-908.

References
Biogr. Wien. ent. Ztschr., 1, 104, 1882

Austrian entomologists
Austrian zoologists
Year of death missing